Jonathan "Jonno" Devlin (born 17 March 1976 in Springs, South Africa) is an Irish rower. He rowed for Great Britain until 2007.

References

External links
 
 

1976 births
Living people
British male rowers
Irish male rowers
People from Springs, Gauteng
Olympic rowers of Ireland
Olympic rowers of Great Britain
Rowers at the 2004 Summer Olympics
Rowers at the 2008 Summer Olympics
World Rowing Championships medalists for Great Britain
Sportspeople from Gauteng